The value-form or form of value is a concept in Karl Marx's critique of political economy. Marx's account of the value-form is differently adopted in later forms of Marxism, in the Frankfurt School and in post-Marxism. When social labor is split up into independent enterprises and organized capitalistically, its products take the form of an ensemble of commodities of diverse types, which face one another on the market. 

Production and exchange are governed by ideas and facts expressible in the forms like:

 20 yards of linen are worth one coat
 20 yards of linen have an equivalent in one coat
 20 yards of linen = one coat
 20 yards of linen cost $100
 The price of 20 yards of linen is $100
 20 yards linen = $100

The formulae above are 'expressions of value' (Wertausdruck).  Worth, price, and equivalent are said to be categories of bourgeois life.  Items that enter on one side or the other, here linen, coat and dollar, are said thereby to have different specific value-forms.  A thing may have a value-form in the imagination – e.g. in the reasoning of a weaver who weaves 20 yards of linen with a view to getting a coat, thinking "20 yards of linen are worth one coat" or in a firm's attaching prices to its products (prices that may or may not be accepted). (An item with a price tag attached has thereby entered the price form in imagination.) But things can also be said to enter these forms objectively, as when it is simply a fact that e.g.

 About 20 yards linen are worth one coat
 The price of 20 yards of linen is about $100

The value-forms are social forms of a product of labor as organized asocially, privately and capitalistically.  If the breakfast menu of a capitalistic restaurant chain reads:

 Toast (two slices) = $1

then toast has assumed a value form as a product of capitalistically associated labor. But in a household, e.g. when feeding the children, the work of making toast – the same 'useful labor' – is associated differently.  No such thought will enter the mind of the toast-maker, who will think directly of the children's needs.  Toast will not assume a form of value.

The value forms are also 'forms of appearance' (German sing.: Erscheinungsform).  The agents work with them, judge in terms of them, and in a sense measure things with them. The capitalistic organization of life operates through this 'appearance' of itself to its bearers. The value-form of a commodity contrasts with its physical features as a 'use value' or good – e.g. as a means of (further) production or as a means of life. The physical characteristics of a commodity are directly observable, and they enter into its direct use, but its social form is not thus perceptible nor inherent in the thing.

Narrating the paradoxical oddities and metaphysical niceties of ordinary things when they become instruments of trade, Marx seeks to provide a brief morphology of the category of economic value as such—what its substance really is, the forms which this substance takes, and how its magnitude is determined or expressed. He analyzes the forms of value in the first instance by considering the meaning of the value-relationship that exists between two quantities of commodities.

Basic explanation

When the concept of the form of value is introduced in the first chapter of Capital, Volume I, Marx clarifies that economic value becomes manifest in an objectified way only through the form of value established by the exchange of products. People know very well that any product represents a value, i.e. there is an economic cost of supply for the product (some people have to work to produce and supply it, so that others can use it). However, Marx questions how value can be quantified, how it can exist, what its source is, and how differences in value can be explained.

Value relation
What something is economically "worth" can be expressed only relatively, by relating, weighing, comparing and equating it to amounts of other tradeable objects (or to the labour effort, resources or sum of money those objects represent). The value of products is expressed by their "exchange-value": what they can trade for, but that exchange-value can be expressed in many different ways. Since exchange-value is most often expressed by a "money-price", it then seems that "exchange value", "value", "price" and "money" are really all the same thing. But Marx argues they are not the same things at all.

This point is important in the understanding of economic value and markets. Precisely because the political economists kept conflating and confusing the most basic economic categories, Marx argued, they were unable to provide a fully consistent theory of the economy. One might be able to quantify and measure economic phenomena, but that does not necessarily mean that they are measured in a way that they are fully understood.

In a preface to the first edition of Capital, Volume I, Marx stated:

Marx gives various reasons for this ancient puzzle. The main obstacle seems to be that trading relations refer to social relations which are not directly observable. What these social relations are, has to be conceptualized with abstract ideas. The trading ratios between commodities and money are certainly observable, via prices and transaction data. Yet how exactly the things being traded get the value they have, is not observable. It seems like "the market" does that, but what the market is, and how that happens, remains rather vague. This story does not get much further than the idea, that things have value, because people want to have them, and are prepared to pay money for them.

Marx's comment clarifies, that according to Marx the value-form of commodities is not simply a feature of industrial capitalism. It is associated with the whole history of commodity trade ("more than 2,000 years"). Marx claimed that the origin of the money-form of value had never before been explained by bourgeois economics, and that "the mystery of money will immediately disappear" once the evolution of value-relations has been traced out from its simplest beginnings. This was probably a vain hope, since, as discussed below, even today economists and economic historians cannot agree about what is the correct theory of money. Wolfgang Streeck states that "money is easily the most unpredictable and least governable human institution we have ever known". Put another way, the possibilities for arranging any type of trade or deal are extremely diverse; the only operative requirement is that the trading partners agree to the terms of the arrangement, however simple or complicated it may be. It follows that, what specific role money has in the given arrangement, can vary greatly.

Only when market production and its corresponding legal system are highly developed, does it becomes possible to understand what "economic value" actually means in a comprehensive and theoretically consistent way, separate from other sorts of value (like aesthetic value or moral value). The reason is that, to a large extent, the different kinds of value have become practically separated in reality and become increasingly universal in their applications. When Marx considers "value" as such or in itself, as a general social form in the economic history of humans, i.e. "the form of value as such", he is abstracting from all the particular expressions it might have.

Marx admitted that the form of value was a somewhat difficult notion, but he assumed "a reader who is willing to learn something new and therefore to think for himself." In a preface to the second edition of Capital, Volume I, Marx claimed that he had "completely revised" his treatment, because his friend Dr. Louis Kugelmann had convinced him that a "more didactic exposition of the form of value" was needed. Usually Marx-scholars refer to both versions anyhow, because each of them provides some extra information which does not occur in the other version.

Commodity form
Marx calls the commodity form, as a basic form of value, "the economic cell-form of bourgeois society", meaning it is the simplest economic unit out of which the "body" of West European capitalist civilization was developed and built up, across six centuries. Wares trade for money, money trades for wares, more and more money is made from this trade, and the markets reach more and more areas - transforming society into the world of business.

The capitalist mode of production is viewed as "generalized" (or universalized) commodity production, i.e. the production of commodities by means of commodities, in a circular self-reproducing flow of actions and transactions (money is exchanged for commodities (including the commodity labour power), used to produce new commodities exchanged for more money, financing more production and consumption). Already in his Grundrisse manuscript of 1858, Marx worked out his insight that "The first category in which bourgeois wealth presents itself is that of the commodity" and that became the opening sentence of his 1859 Critique and the first volume of Capital (1867).

The "forms of value" of commodities are only the first of a series of social forms which Marx analyzes in Das Kapital, such as the forms of money, the forms of capital, the forms of wages, and the forms of profit. All of these are different forms of value, normally expressed by prices, yet they all presuppose the exchange of tradeable wares. In Marx's dialectical story, each of these forms is shown to grow out of (or "transform" into) other forms, and so all the forms are connected with each other, step by step, logically and historically.

Each form is expressed with categories, the content of which evolves or mutates to some degree in response to new distinctions or circumstances. At the end of the story, all the forms appear seamlessly integrated with each other in a self-reproducing, constantly expanding capitalist system, of which the distant historical origin has become hidden and obscure; the fully developed system appears other than it really is, and does not transparently disclose its real nature.

If the workings of the capitalist system were perfectly obvious and transparent, Marx argues, then there would be no need for any special economic "science"; one would just be stating platitudes. They prompt further inquiry, because they turn out to be not as obvious as they seem, and indeed become rather puzzling or even mindboggling, on further reflection. Economists are constantly trying to "second-guess" what the market will do, and what the overall effects might be of transaction patterns, but in truth they often don't succeed any better than astrologers. A critical re-examination is then called for, of precisely those ordinary phenomena which were previously taken for granted.

After his first cryptic attempt at telling the story (in 168 pages) flopped when he published it in Germany, Marx resolved to tell it another time, in a much more interesting, intriguing and elaborate way, so that people would really grasp the significance of it—beginning from exactly the same starting point. That became Das Kapital (1867-1894), which is still being read and discussed today.

Marx initially defines a product of human labour that has become a commodity (in German: Kaufware, i.e., merchandise, ware for sale) as being simultaneously:

 A useful object that can satisfy a want or need (a use value); this is the object valued from the point of view of consuming or using it, referring to its observable material form, i.e., the tangible, observable characteristics it has that make it useful, and therefore valued by people, even if the use is only symbolic.
 An object of economic value generally; this is the value of the object considered from the point of view of its supply cost, commercial value, or "what you can get for it". The reference here is to the social form of the product, which is not directly observable.

The "form of value" (also a reference to phenomenology in the classical philosophical sense used by Hegel) then refers to the specific ways of relating through which "what a commodity is worth" happens to be socially expressed in trading processes, when different products and assets are compared with each other.

Practically speaking, Marx argues that the product values cannot be directly observed and can become observably manifest only as exchange-values, i.e., as relative expressions, by comparing their worth to other goods they can be traded for (usually via money prices). This causes people to think value and exchange-value are the same thing, but Marx argues they are not; the content, magnitude and form of value must be distinguished, and according to the law of value, the exchange value of products being traded is determined and regulated by their value. His argument is, that the market prices of a commodity will oscillate around its value, and its value is the outcome of the average, normal labour requirements to produce it.

Metamorphosis
Marx argues that the forms of value are not "static" or "fixed once and for all", but rather, that they develop logically and historically in trading processes from very simple, primitive expressions to very complicated or sophisticated expressions. Subsequently, he also examines the various forms taken by capital, the forms of wages, the forms of profit and so forth. In each case, the form denotes how a specific social or economic relationship among people is expressed or symbolized.

In the process of circulation, production, distribution, and consumption, value metamorphoses from one form to another. Different forms of value – currencies, commodities and capitals – all trade for each other, where buyers and sellers convert money into goods, and goods into money, or convert one type of capital asset into another type of capital asset, in markets where prices fluctuate all the time.

According to Marx, the individual acts of exchange in themselves cannot alter the underlying value of goods and assets, at least not in the ordinary situation. Put differently, value is ordinarily conserved through successive acts of exchange (a "conservation principle") even although the forms that value takes can change. If goods and assets did not at least hold their value upon exchange, then warehousing, freighting and commercial trade itself would very likely break down. That insight existed already in ancient times. In speculative activity, the conservation principle is, however, not always true.

Primitive exchange
Initially, in primitive exchange, the form that economic value takes does not involve any prices, since what something is "worth" is very simply expressed in (a quantity of) some other good (an occasional barter relationship). Some scholars, such as Hans-Georg Backhaus, argue that for this reason value simply did not exist in societies where money was not used, or where it played only a marginal role. The old Friedrich Engels claimed that "in primitive communism value was unknown", because there was no regular commodity trade.

Marx, though, acknowledged that product-values "of a sort" did exist in primitive economies, although value did not exist as a separate "thing" in such communities. Establishing "how much products were worth", he says, followed "customary practices", rather than purely a comparison with the value of other products, or reckoning with money; thus, the valuation of products was expressed in a different way (see also archaeology of trade). An "economy of labour-time" existed, although no supremely exact measures were available for work effort, time, storage and energy. All the time, that is, people knew quite well that their products had value, because it cost work-effort to replace them, and, consequently, they also valued their products. They could hardly afford to trade products on very unfavourable terms, because that would take them beyond the limits of their own available work-time; that mattered, because average labour productivity was low - it took a lot of time to produce food, clothing, shelter, tools and weapons. Whatever the trading custom was, it had to be at least compatible with survival requirements. If not, the custom would die out.

In the most primitive (simplest) situation, people acquire objects for which they have a use by borrowing, trading or bartering, in exchange for other goods that they don't particularly have a need for themselves. They value things directly because of their useful qualities and because it takes work-time to get them (their own work and/or the work of others). In the process, customary norms develop for what counts as a normal, balanced exchange. There isn't just one way to trade a good, goods could be traded on all kinds of terms, but to pick the appropriate method, all kinds of factors might have to be taken in consideration. If a good was traded in the wrong way, for example because cultural conventions were not respected, it might have consequences that the traders were not really looking for.
At the most abstract, developed level though, the value form is only a purely monetary relationship between objects, or an abstract earnings potential or credit provision, based on some assumptions, which may not even refer to any tangible object of trade anymore at all. There is, for example, only a number on a computer screen. At that point, it appears that the value of an asset is simply determined by the amount of income that could be obtained if the asset were traded under certain conditions, and within a given time interval.

Social relations

By analyzing the forms of value, Marx aims to show that when people bring their products into relation with each other in market trade, they are also socially related in specific ways (whether they like it or not, and whether they are aware of it or not), and that this fact very strongly influences the very way in which they think about how they are related. It influences how they will view the whole human interactive process of giving and receiving, taking and procuring, sharing and relinquishing, accepting and rejecting—and how to balance all that.

Some social relations we choose and make ourselves, but we are also socially related simply by being part of a community and a nation (or part of a family, an organization etc.), whether we like that or not. In trading roles, people have to deal with both of these kinds of social relations - simultaneously competing to get the best deal, and co-operating to obtain what they want. The trading process has both a voluntary aspect (freedoms, things to choose) and an involuntary aspect (constraints, things that have to be worked with to make a deal). To make the trade, buyers and sellers must respect each other's right to their own property, and their right to do with their own property what they want, within the framework of laws, customs and norms (Marx discusses the notion of the formal equality of market actors more in the Grundrisse). If the market actors simply grabbed stuff from others, that would not be trade, but robbery (which would not qualify as civilized conduct, and carries a reputational risk as well as being subject to legal sanctions).

The forms of value of products do not merely refer to a "trading valuation of objects"; they refer also to a certain way of relating or interacting, and a mentality, among human subjects who internalize the forms of value, so that the manifestations of economic value become regarded as completely normal, natural and self-evident in human interactions (a "market culture," which is also reflected in language use). Marx himself refers surrealistically to "the language of commodities", the talk and signals they send and receive in the topsy-turvy world (verkehrte Welt) of trading processes, and he adds satirically in a footnote that "in a certain sense, people are in the same situation as commodities…". The suggestion is that, by analogy, the recognition of a person's identity and worth occurs only through contact with other people, and that one person becomes the species-model for another, just as commodities need to relate to each other and to money to establish what the magnitude of their value is.

Marx's description of what goes on in commodity exchanges highlights not only that value relationships appear to exist between commodities quite independently of the valuers, but also that people accept that these relationships exist, even although they do not understand exactly what they are, or why they exist at all. We know that a particular market exists, if there are buyers and sellers. With experience, we can identify them, and estimate a normal turnover. However, the totality of interactions and transactions in all markets combined simultaneously, can easily appear as an unfathomable abstraction.

Genesis of the forms of value
Marx distinguishes between four successive steps in the process of trading products, i.e., in the circulation of commodities, through which fairly stable and objective value proportionalities (Wertverhältnisse in German) are formed that express "what products are 

worth". These steps are:

1. The simple form of value, an expression that contains the duality of relative value and equivalent value.
2. The expanded or total form of value, a quantitative "chaining together" of the simple forms of expressing value.
3. The general form of value, i.e., the expression of the worth of all products reckoned in a general equivalent.
4. The money-form of value, which is a general equivalent used in trading (a medium of exchange) that is universally exchangeable.

These forms are different ways of symbolizing and representing what goods are worth, to facilitate trade and cost/benefit calculations. The simple form of value does not (or not necessarily) involve a money-referent at all, and the expanded and general forms are intermediary expressions between a non-monetary and a monetary expression of economic value. The four steps are an abstract summary of what essentially happens to the trading relationship when the trade in products grows and develops beyond incidental barter.

Simple form of value

The value relationship in Marx's economic sense begins to emerge, when we are able to state that one bundle of use-values is worth the same as another bundle of (different) use-values. That happens when the bundles of products are regularly traded for each other, and thus are regarded as instruments of trade. It is a quantitative relationship between quantities, implicitly expressed in the same unit of measurement. The simplest expression of the form of value can be stated as the following equation:

where the value of X{A} is expressed relatively, as being equal to a certain quantity of B, meaning that X{A} is the relative form of value and Y{B} the equivalent form of value, so that B is effectively the value-form of (expresses the value of) A. If we ask "how much is X quantity of commodity A worth?" the answer is "Y quantity of commodity B".

This simple equation, expressing a simple value proportion between products, however permits several possibilities of differences in valuation emerging within the circulation of products:

the absolute value of X{A} changes, but the absolute value of Y{B} stays constant; in this case, the change in the relative value of X{A} depends only on a change in the absolute value of A (The absolute value, Marx argues, is the total labour cost on average implicated in making a commodity).
the absolute value of X{A} stays constant, but the absolute value of Y{B} changes; in this case, the relative value of X{A} fluctuates in inverse relation to changes in the absolute value of B, meaning that if Y{B} goes down then X{A} goes up, while if Y{B} goes up then X{A} goes down.
the values of X{A} and Y{B} both change in the same direction and in the same proportion. In this case, the equation still holds, but the change in absolute value is noticeable only if X{A} and Y{B} are compared with a commodity C, where C's value stays constant. If all commodities increase or decrease in value by the same amount, then their relative values all remain exactly the same.
the values of X{A} and Y{B} change in the same direction, but not by the same amount, or vary in opposite directions.

These possible changes in valuation enable us to understand already that what any particular product will trade for is delimited by what other products will trade for, quite independently of how much the buyer would like to pay, or how much the seller would like to get in return.

Value should not be confused with price here, however, because products can be traded at prices above or below what they are worth (implying value-price deviations; this complicates the picture and is elaborated only in the third volume of Das Kapital). There are value-structures and price-structures. For simplicity's sake, Marx assumes initially that the money-price of a commodity will be equal to its value (ordinarily, price-value deviations would not be very great); but in Capital, Volume III it becomes clear that the sale of goods above or below their value has a crucial effect on aggregate profits.

The main implications of the simple relative form of value are that:

The value of an individual commodity can change relative to other commodities, although the real cost in labour of that particular commodity stays constant, and vice versa, the real labour cost of that particular commodity can vary, although its relative value remains the same; this means that goods can be devalued or revalued depending on what happens elsewhere in the trading system and on changes in the conditions of producing them elsewhere. It would therefore be wrong to claim, as some Marxists (Mandel, Ollman, Carchedi) argue, that for Marx "economic value is labour"; rather, the economic value of products really refers to the current social valuation of average labour effort implicated in products.
That the absolute and relative values of commodities can change constantly, in proportions which do not exactly compensate each other, or cancel each other out, via haphazard adjustments to new production and demand conditions.

Marx also argues that, at the same time, such an economic equation accomplishes two other things:

the value of specific labour activities is implicitly related in proportion to the value of labour in general, and
 private labour activities, carried out independently of each other, are socially recognized as being a fraction of society's total labour.

Effectively, a social nexus (a societal connection or bond) is established and affirmed via the value-comparisons in the marketplace, which makes relative labour costs (the expenditures of human work energy) the real substance of value. Obviously, some assets are not produced by human labour at all, but how they are valued commercially will nevertheless refer, explicitly or implicitly, directly or indirectly, to the comparative cost structure of related assets that are labour-products.

A tree in the middle of the Amazon Rain Forest has no commercial value where it stands. We can estimate its value only by estimating what it would cost to cut it down, what it would sell for in markets, or what income we could currently get from it — or how much we could charge people to look at it. Imputing an "acceptable price" to the tree, assumes that there already exists a market in timber, or in forests, that tells us what the tree would normally be worth.

Expanded form of value

In the expanded form of value, the equation process between quantities of different commodities is simply continued serially, so that their values relative to each other are established, and they can all be expressed in some or other commodity-equivalent. The expanded value-form expression really represents only an extension of the simple value form, where products alternate as relative and equivalent forms in order to be equated to each other.

Marx argues that, as such, the expanded form of value is practically inadequate, because to express what any commodity is worth might now require the calculation of a whole "chain" of comparisons, i.e.

What this means is, that if A is normally traded for B, and B is normally traded for C, then to find out how much A is worth in terms of C, we first have to convert the amounts into B (and maybe many more intermediate steps). This is obviously inefficient if many goods are traded at the same time.

General form of value

The practical solution in trade is therefore the emergence of a general form of value, in which the values of all kinds of bundles of commodities can be expressed in amounts of one standard commodity (or just a few standards) which function as a general equivalent. The general equivalent has itself no relative form of value in common with other commodities; instead its value is expressed only in a myriad of other commodities.

  =  

In ancient civilizations where considerable market trade occurred, there were usually a few types of goods that could function as a general standard of value. This standard served for value comparisons; it did not necessarily mean that goods were actually traded for the standard commodity. This rather cumbersome approach is solved with the introduction of money—the owner of a product can sell it for money, and buy another product he wants with money, without worrying anymore about whether the thing offered in exchange for his own product is indeed the product that he wants himself. Now, the only limit to trade is the development and growth rate of the market.

Money-form of value

Just because quantities of goods can be expressed in amounts of a general equivalent, which acts as a referent, this does not mean that they can necessarily all be traded for that equivalent. The general equivalent may only be a sort of yardstick used to compare what goods are worth. Hence, the general equivalent form in practice gives way to the money-commodity, which is a universal equivalent, meaning that (provided people are willing to trade) it possesses the characteristic of direct and universal exchangeability in precisely measured quantities.

  =  

But for most of the history of human civilization, money was not actually universally used, partly because the prevailing systems of property rights and cultural custom did not allow many goods to be sold for money, and partly because many products were distributed and traded without using money. Also, several different "currencies" were often used side by side. Marx himself believed that nomadic peoples were the first to develop the money-form of value (in the sense of a universal equivalent in trade) because all their possessions were mobile, and because they were regularly in contact with different communities, which encouraged the exchange of products.

When money is generally used in trade, money becomes the general expression of the form of value of goods being traded; usually this is associated with the emergence of a state authority issuing legal currency. At that point the form of value appears to have acquired a fully independent, separate existence from any particular traded object (behind this autonomy, however, is the power of state authorities or private agencies to enforce financial claims).

Once the money-commodity (e.g., gold, silver, bronze) is securely established as a stable medium of exchange, symbolic money-tokens (e.g., bank notes and debt claims) issued by the state, trading houses or corporations can in principle substitute paper money or debt obligations for the "real thing" on a regular basis.

At first, these "paper claims" (legal tender) are by law convertible on demand into quantities of gold, silver etc., and they circulate alongside precious metals. But gradually currencies come into use that are not so convertible, i.e., "fiduciary money" or fiat money which relies on social trust that people will honor their transactional obligations. These kinds of fiduciary money rely not on the value of money-tokens themselves (as in commodity money), but on the ability to enforce financial claims and contracts, principally by means of the power and laws of the state, but also by other institutional methods. Eventually, as Marx anticipated in 1844, precious metals play very little role anymore in the monetary system.

Alongside fiat money, credit money also develops more and more. Credit money, although expressed in currency units, does not consist of money tokens. It consists rather of financial claims, including of all kinds of debt certificates (promissory notes) which entitle the holder to future income under contractually specified conditions. These claims can themselves be traded for profit. Credit arrangements existed already in the ancient world, but there was no very large-scale trade in debt obligations. In the modern world, the majority of money no longer consists of money tokens, but of credit money. Marx was quite aware of the role of credit money, but he did not analyze it in depth. His concern was only with how the credit system directly impacted on the capitalist production process.

The ultimate universal equivalent according to Marx is "world money", i.e., financial instruments that are accepted and usable for trading purposes everywhere, such as bullion. In the world market, the value of commodities is expressed by a universal standard, so that their "independent value-form" appears to traders as "universal money". Nowadays the US dollar, the Euro, and the Japanese Yen are widely used as "world currencies" providing a near-universal standard and measure of value. They are used as a means of exchange worldwide, and consequently most governments have significant reserves or claims to these currencies.

Implications
Marx's four steps in the development of the form of value are mainly an analytical or logical progression, which may not always conform to the actual historical processes by which objects begin to acquire a relatively stable value and are traded as commodities. Three reasons are:

Various different methods of trade (including counter-trade) may always exist and persist side by side. Thus, simpler and more developed expressions of value may be used in trade at the same time, or combined (for example, in order to fix a rate of exchange, traders may have to reckon how much of commodity B can be acquired, if commodity A is traded).
Market and non-market methods of allocating resources may combine, and they can combine in rather unusual ways. The act of sale, for example, may not only give the new owner of a good possession of it, but also grant or deny access to other goods. The actual distinction between selling and barter may not be so easy to draw, and all kinds of "deals" can be done in which the trade of one thing has consequences for the possession of other things.
Objects that previously had no socially accepted value at all, may acquire it in a situation where money is already used, simply by imputing or attaching a money-price to them. In this way, objects can acquire the form of value "all at once"—they are suddenly integrated in an already existing market (the only prerequisite is, that somebody owns the trading rights for those objects). Bertram Schefold notes that in medieval Japan, the Empress Genmei simply decreed the introduction of minted coinage one day in 708 CE (the so-called wadōkaichin), to "lighten the burden of carrying around commodity equivalents" such as arrowheads, rice and gold.

It is just that, typically, what the socially accepted value of a wholly new kind of object will be, requires the practical "test" of a regular trading process, assuming a regular supply by producers and a regular demand for it, which establishes a trading "norm" consistent with production costs. A new object that wasn't traded previously may be traded far above or below its real value, until the supply and demand for it stabilizes, and its exchange-value fluctuates only within relatively narrow margins (in orthodox economics, this process is acknowledged as a form of price discovery).

The development of the form of value through the growth of trading processes involves a continuous dual equalization & relativization process (this is sometimes referred to as a type of "market adjustment"):

the worth of products and assets relative to each other is established with increasingly precise equations, creating a structure of relative values;
the comparative labour efforts required to make the products are also valued in an increasingly standardized way at the same time. For almost any particular type of labour, it can then be specified, fairly accurately, how much money it would take, on average, to employ that labour and get the use out of that labour. To get any type of job done, there is then a normal price tag for the labour involved.

Six main effects of this are:

The process of market-expansion, involving the circulation of more and more goods, services and money, leads to the development of the form of value of products, which includes and transforms more and more aspects of human life, until almost everything is structured by the forms of value;
That it increasingly seems as though economic value ("what things are worth") is a natural, intrinsic characteristic of products and assets (just like the characteristics that make them useful) rather than a social effect created by labour-cooperation and human effort;
what any particular kind of labour is worth, becomes largely determined by the value of the tradeable product of the labour, and labour becomes organized according to the value it produces.
The development of markets leads to the capitalization of money, products and services: the trade of money for goods, and goods for money, leads directly to the use of the trading process purely to "make money" from it (a practice known in classical Greece as "chrematistics"). This is what Marx regards as the true origin of capital, long before capital's conquest of the whole of production.
Labour power that creates no commodity value or does not have the potential to do so, has no value for commercial purposes, and is therefore usually not highly valued economically, except insofar as it reduces costs that would otherwise be incurred.
The diffusion of value relations eradicates traditional social relations and corrodes all social relations not compatible with commerce; the valuation that becomes of prime importance is what something will trade for. The end result is the emergence of the trading circuit M-C...P...C'-M', which indicates that production has become a means for the process of making money (that is, Money [=M] buys commodities [=C] which are transformed through production [=P] into new commodities [=C'], and, upon sale, result in more money [=M'] than existed at the start).

Generalized commodity production

Capital existed in the form of trading capital already thousands of years before capitalist factories emerged in the towns; its owners (whether rentiers, merchants or state functionaries) often functioned as intermediaries between commodity producers. They facilitated exchange, for a price—they made money from trade. Marx defines the capitalist mode of production as "generalized (or universalized) commodity production", meaning that most goods and services are produced primarily for commercial purposes, for profitable market sale in a universal market.

This has the consequence, that both the inputs and the outputs of production (including labour power) become tradeable objects with prices, and that the whole of production is reorganized according to commercial principles. Whereas originally commercial trade occurred episodically at the boundaries of different communities, Marx argues, eventually commerce engulfs and reshapes the whole production process of those communities. This involves the transformation of a large part of the labour force into wage-labour (the sale of labour power as a commodity), and the capitalization of labour employed (surplus labour creates surplus value).

In turn, this means what whether or not a product will be produced, and how it will be produced, depends not simply on whether it is physically possible to produce it or on whether people need it, but on its financial cost of production, whether a sufficient amount can be sold, and whether its production yields sufficient profit income. That is also why Marx regarded the individual commodity, which simultaneously represents value and use-value as the "cell" (or the "cell-form") in the "body" of capitalism. The seller primarily wants money for his product and is not really concerned with its consumption or use (other than from the point of view of making sales); the buyer wants to use or consume the product, and money is the means to acquire it from any convenient source.

Thus the seller does not aim directly to satisfy the need of the buyer, nor does the buyer aim to enrich the seller. Rather, the buyer and the seller are the means for each other to acquire money or goods. As a corollary, production may become less and less a creative activity to satisfy human needs, but simply a means to make money or acquire access to goods and services. Richard Sennett provides a eulogy for the vanishing art of craftsmanship in capitalist society. As against that, products obviously could not be sold unless people need them, and unless that need is practically acknowledged. The social effect is that the motives for trading may be hidden to some or other extent, or appear somewhat differently from what they really are (in this sense, Marx uses the concept of "character masks").

Reification

The concept of the form of value shows how, with the development of commodity trade, anything with a utility for people can be transformed into an abstract value, objectively expressible as a sum of money; but, also, how this transformation changes the organization of labour to maximize its value-creating capacity, how it changes social interactions and the very way people are aware of their interactions.

However, the quantification of objects and the manipulation of quantities ineluctably leads to distortions (reifications) of their qualitative properties. For the sake of obtaining a measure of magnitude, it is frequently assumed that objects are quantifiable, but in the process of quantification, various qualitative aspects are conveniently ignored or abstracted away from. Obviously the expression of everything in money prices is not the only valuation that can, or should, be made. Mathematics is enormously important for economic analysis, but it is, potentially, also a formidable source of ultimate reification (since reducing an economic phenomenon to an abstract number might disregard almost everything necessary to understand it).

Essentially, Marx argues that if the values of things are to express social relations, then, in trading activity, people necessarily have to "act" symbolically in a way that inverts the relations among objects and subjects, whether they are aware of that or not. They have to treat a relationship as if it is a thing in its own right. In an advertisement, a financial institution might for example say "with us, your money works for you", but money does not "work", people do. A relationship gets treated as a thing, and a relationship between people is expressed as a relationship between things.

Marketisation

The total implications of the development of the forms of value are much more farreaching than can be described in this article, since (1) the processes by which the things people use are transformed into objects of trade (often called commodification, commercialization or marketization) and (2) the social effects of these processes, are both extremely diverse. A very large literature exists about the growth of business relationships in all sorts of areas, highlighting both progress, and destruction of traditional ways.

For capitalism to exist, markets must grow, but market growth requires changes in the way people relate socially, and changes in property rights. This is often a problem-fraught and conflict-ridden process, as Marx describes in his story about primitive accumulation. During the 20th century, there was hardly a year without wars occurring somewhere in the world. As the global expansion of business competition broke up the traditional social structures and traditional property rights everywhere, it caused political instability and continual conflicts between social classes, ethnic groups, religions and nations, in different places, as well as a series of revolutions and coups d'état (analyzed e.g. by sociologists like Theda Skocpol and Charles Tilly). Almost all socialist countries that appeared in the 20th century arose out of wars.

Wars are generally bad for business (except for the military industry and its suppliers), nobody likes them, and governments try to prevent them, but in reality the marketisation of the world has often been a very aggressive, violent process. Typically, therefore, the advocates of peaceful market trade blame "everything but the market" for the explosions of mass violence that occur, with the promise that, if people would just sit down and negotiate a deal, they wouldn't have to use force to get what they want. This assumes that market trade is something quite separate from political power, because it is market-trade, i.e. a free negotiation between trading partners who are equals in the marketplace.

Value-form and price-form
In his story, Marx defines the magnitude of "value" simply as the ratio of a physical quantity of product to a quantity of average labour-time, which is equal to a quantity of gold-money (in other words, a scalar):

X quantity of product = Y quantity of average labour hours = Z quantity of gold-money

He admits early on, that the assumption of gold-money is a theoretical simplification, since the buying power of money tokens can vary due to causes that have nothing to do with the production system (within certain limits, X, Y and Z can vary independently of each other); but he thought it was useful to reveal the structure of economic relationships involved in the capitalist mode of production, as a prologue to analyzing the motion of the system as a whole; and, he believed that variations in the buying power of money did not alter that structure at all, insofar as the working population was forced to produce in order to survive, and in so doing entered into societal relations of production independent of their will; the basic system of property rights remained the same, irrespective of whether products and labour were traded for a higher or a lower price.

As any banker or speculator knows, however, the expression of the value of something as a quantity of money-units is by no means the "final and ultimate expression of value".

At the simplest level, the reason is that different "monies" (currencies) may be used side by side in the trading process, meaning that "what something is worth" may require expressing one currency in another currency and that one currency is traded against another, where currency exchange rates fluctuate all the time. Thus, money itself can take many different forms.
In more sophisticated trade, moreover, what is traded is not money itself, but rather claims to money ("financial claims" and counter-claims, for example debt obligations, borrowing facilities or stocks that provide the holder with an income).
And in even more sophisticated trade, what is traded is the insurance of financial claims against the risk of possible monetary loss. In turn, money can be made just from the knowledge about the probability that a financial trend or risk will occur or will not occur.

Eventually financial trade becomes so complex, that what a financial asset is worth is often no longer expressible in any exact quantity of money (a "cash value") without all sorts of qualifications, and that its worth becomes entirely conditional on its expected earnings potential.

In Capital Volume 3, which he drafted before Volume I, Marx shows he was well aware of this. He distinguished not only between "real capital" (physical, tangible capital assets) and "money capital", but also noted the existence of "fictitious capital" and pseudo-commodities that strictly speaking have only symbolic value. Marx believed that a failure to theorize the forms of value correctly led to "the strangest and most contradictory ideas about money," which "emerges sharply... in [the theory of] banking, where the commonplace definitions of money no longer hold water".

Price-form

Consistent with this, Marx explicitly introduced a distinction between the form of value and the price-form early on in Capital, Volume I. Simply put, the price-form is a mediator of trade that is separate and distinct from the forms of value that products have. Prices express exchange-value in units of money. A price is a "sign" that conveys information about either a possible or a realized transaction (or both at the same time). The information may be true or false; it may refer to observables or unobservables; it may be estimated, assumed or probable. However, because prices are also numbers, it is easy to treat them as manipulable "things" in their own right, in abstraction from their appropriate context. As Viktor Mayer-Schönberger puts it, "...in the process of distilling information down to price, many details get lost."

Latin root
The ambiguity of the modern concept of "price" already existed in the Latin root meaning of the word, in Roman times. It has persisted in modern times. Thus, for example, in 1912, Frank Fetter gathered 117 different definitions of "price" used by economists, which he grouped under three categories: objective exchange-value, subjective value, and ratio of exchange. The 
The Latin verb itio means "going, travelling", as in "itinerary", and the Latin derivation pretiosus means "valuable or costly".

"Pretium", the Latin word for price, had no less than ten discrete meanings, depending on the context:
what something is worth: the value, the valuation, the (sum of) money represented, or the exchange-value of something.
the purchase (or acquisition) cost, or the expense of something.
the amount of a bid, a bet, an offer, or an estimate.
a compensation, a requital or a return for a service.
the worth, yield, or benefit of a thing or an activity, in terms of what is gained (as compared to cost or effort).
a reward, an honour, or a prize granted.
an incentive or a stimulus.
the wage of a hireling, the payment for a slave or a harlot, the rent for a hired good. 
the penalty or retribution for a mistake, for a failure or for a crime.
the amount of a bribe, a graft payment, or a ransom deal.

Each of these ten sorts of price ideas referred to different social relations. Each social relationship, in turn, involves some kind of transaction - an exchange, an investment, an award, a grant, a fine, a disbursement or transfer, a compensation payment etc. The word "transaction" is itself derived from the Latin transactionem, meaning an "agreement", "an accomplishment", "a done deal". The Latin word transactor refers to the mediator or intermediary operative in some kind of deal, and transactus means "pierced", "penetrated", or "stuck through" (many Roman coins had holes through them, for storage on a string, or decorative purposes).

The word pretium, or a price number, do not make all that explicit. Nevertheless, the classical concept of price already clearly displayed both an economic or instrumental dimension, and a moral dimension (some prices are appropriate and just, others aren't). According to Stephen Gudeman, one aspect of the fetish of prices can manifest itself, when "prices only refer to themselves". Prices refer only to themselves, when they are lifted out of the transactional and social context from which they originated, and acquire an independent reality, where price numbers only relate to other price numbers. In that sense, the price numbers might hide as much as they reveal. While people are focused on the numbers, they forget about the real context that gives rise to the numbers. By the time that price numbers decide how people will be relating, prices have acquired a tremendous power in human affairs.

The price resulting from a calculation may be regarded as symbolizing (representing) one transaction, or many transactions at once, but the validity of this "price abstraction" all depends on whether the computational procedure and valuation method are accepted. The modern notion of "the price of something" is often applied to sums of money denoting various quite different financial categories (e.g. a purchase or sale cost, the amount of a liability, the amount of a compensation, an asset value, an asset yield, an interest rate etc.). It can be difficult to work out, even for an economist, what a price really means, and price information can be deceptive.

A (simple) price is transparent, if (1) it expresses clearly how much money has to be paid to acquire a product, asset or service, and if (2) its meaning is understood in the same way by all concerned. Things get more complicated, if many prices have to be added, subtracted, divided and multiplied in order to value something (an aggregated total price). Here, a method of price calculation is involved which assumes conventions, definitions and concepts which could vary to some or other extent. In order to understand this price, it is necessary to understand how it is arrived at, and whether the method is acceptable or correct.

Value vs. price
According to Marx, the price-form is the idealized (symbolic) expression of the money-form of value that is used in trading things, calculating costs and benefits, and assessing what things are worth. As such, it is not a "further development" of the form of value itself, and exists independently of the latter, for five reasons:

 The (simple) price equates a quantity of one specific type of use-value to a quantity of money, whereas the meaning of "money form of value" is, that a given quantity of money will exchange for a quantity of any of the different kinds of use-values which the money can buy. So, the "money form of value" is not the same as a "price", in the first instance because the money form of value refers to an indeterminate variety of N commodities that are all equivalents for a given quantity of money. If we want to know "the price of fish", we need specific information about the kind of fish which are currently on offer. At best one could say, that the money form of value is an "index of monetized exchangeability". 
As Marx notes, prices may be attached to almost anything at all ("the price of owning, using or borrowing something"), and therefore need not express product-values at all. The price form expressing a type of transaction does not have to express a form of value. Prices do not necessarily have anything to do with the production or consumption of tangible wealth, although they might facilitate claims to it. The prices of some types of assets are not formed by any product-values at all. This point becomes especially important when we leave the sphere of production and the distribution of products altogether, and enter other sectors of economic life.
Each of Marx's four forms of value which mark successive developmental phases in the trading process can alternatively also be reckoned in terms of money prices, once a generally accepted currency exists. Money-prices can exist, even although stable product-values have not (yet) been formed through regular production and trade.
Insofar as the price of a commodity does express its value accurately, this does not necessarily mean that it will actually trade at this price; products can trade at prices above or below what the goods are really worth, or fail to be traded at any price.
Although as a rule there will be a strong positive correlation between product-prices and product-values, they may change completely independently of each other for all kinds of reasons. When things are bought or sold, they may be over-valued or under-valued due to all kinds of circumstances.

In Marx's theory of the capitalist mode of production, not just anything has a value in the economic sense, even if things can be priced. Only the products of human labour have the property of value, and their "value" is the total current labour cost implicated in making them, on average. Financial assets are regarded as tradeable claims to value, which can be exchanged for tangible assets. The "value" of a financial asset is defined by what and how much the owner can buy, if the asset is traded/sold.

Value relationships among physical products or labour-services and physical assets — as proportions of current labour effort involved in making them — exist according to Marx quite independently from price information, and prices can oscillate in all sorts of ways around economic values, or indeed quite independently of them. However, the expression of product-value by prices in money-units in most cases does not diverge very greatly from the actual value; if there was a very big difference, people would not be able to sell them (insufficient income), or they would not buy them (too expensive, relative to other options).

If prices for products rise, hours worked may rise, and if prices fall, hours worked may fall (sometimes the reverse may also occur, to the extent that extra hours are worked, to compensate for lower income resulting from lower prices, or if more sales occur because prices are lowered). In that sense, it is certainly true that product-prices and product-values mutually influence each other. It is just that, according to Marx, product-values are not determined by the labor-efforts of any particular enterprise, but by the combined result of all of them.

Real prices and ideal prices

In discussing the form of prices in various draft manuscripts and in Das Kapital, Marx drew an essential distinction between actual prices charged and paid, i.e., prices that express how much money really changed hands, and various "ideal prices" (imaginary or notional prices).

Because prices are symbols or indicators in more or less the same way as traffic lights are, they can symbolize something that really exists (e.g., hard cash) but they can also symbolize something that doesn't exist, or symbolize other symbols. The concept of price is often used in a very loose sense to refer to all kinds of transactional possibilities. That can make the forms of prices highly variegated, flexible and complex to understand, but also potentially very deceptive, disguising the real relationships involved.

Modern economics is largely a "price science" (a science of "price behaviour"), in which economists attempt to analyze, explain and predict the relationships between different kinds of prices—using the laws of supply and demand as a guiding principle. These prices are mostly just numbers, where the numbers are believed to represent real prices, in some way, as an idealization. Mathematics then provides a logical language, to talk about what these prices might do, and to calculate pricing effects. This however was not Marx's primary concern; he focused rather on the structure and dynamics of the capitalism as a social system. His concern was with the overall results that market activity would lead to in human society.

In what Marx called "vulgar economics", the complexity of the concept of prices is ignored however, because, Marx claimed in Theories of Surplus Value and other writings, the vulgar economists assumed that:

Since they all express a quantity of money, all prices belong to the same object class (they are qualitatively the same, and differ only quantitatively, irrespective of the type of transaction with which they are associated, or the valuation principles used).
For theoretical purposes, there is no substantive difference between price idealizations and prices which are actually charged.
"Price" is just another word for "value", i.e., value and price are identical expressions, since the value relationship simply expresses a relationship between a quantity of money and a quantity of some other economic good.
Prices are always exact, in the same way that numbers are exact (disregarding price estimation, valuation changes and accounting error).
Price information is always objective (i.e., it is never influenced by how people regard that information).
People always have equal access to information about prices (in which case swindles are merely an aberration from the normal functioning of markets, rather than an integral feature of them, which requires continual policing).
The price for any particular type of good is always determined in exactly the same way everywhere, according to the same economic laws, regardless of the given social set-up.

In his critique of political economy, Marx denied that any of these assumptions were scientifically true (see further real prices and ideal prices). He distinguished carefully between the values, exchange values, market values, market prices and prices of production of commodities.

However, he did not analyze all the different forms that prices can take (for example, market-driven prices, administered prices, accounting prices, negotiated and fixed prices, estimated prices, nominal prices, or inflation-adjusted prices) focusing mainly on the value proportions he thought to be central to the functioning of the capitalist mode of production as a social system. The effect of this omission was that debates about the relevance of Marx's value theory became confused, and that Marxists repeated the same ideas which Marx himself had rejected as "vulgar economics". In other words, they accepted a vulgar concept of price. Koray Çalışkan comments: "A mysterious certainty dominates our lives in late capitalist modernity: the price. Not a single day passes without learning, making, and taking it. Yet despite prices’ widespread presence around us, we do not know much about them."

Fluctuating price signals serve to adjust product-values and labour efforts to each other, in an approximate way; prices are mediators in this sense. But that which mediates should not be confused with what is mediated. Thus, if the observable price-relationships are simply taken at face value, they might at best create a distorted picture, and at worst a totally false picture of the economic activity to which they refer. At the surface, price aggregations might quantitatively express an economic relationship in the simplest way, but in the process they might abstract away from other features of the economic relationship that are also very essential to know. Indeed, that is another important reason why Marx's analysis of economic value largely disregards the intricacies of price fluctuations; it seeks to discover the real economic movement behind the price fluctuations.

Sources

Aristotle and Samuel Bailey

Marx borrowed the idea of the form of value from the Greek philosopher Aristotle (circa 384-322 BC), who pondered the nature of exchange value in chapter 5 of Book 5 in his Nicomachean Ethics. Aristotle distinguished clearly between the concepts of use-value and exchange-value (a distinction taken over by Adam Smith). Aristotle developed a fairly sophisticated theory of money, and in chapter 9 of Book 1 of his Politics, he describes the circuits of commodity trade C-M-C' (oekonomia) and M-C-M' (chrematistikon). However, Marx criticized and developed Aristotle's ideas in an original way.

In so doing, Marx was also influenced by, and responding to, the "classical" political economy discourse about the economic laws governing commodity values and money, in Europe beginning (in Marx's view) with William Petty's Quantulumcunque Concerning Money (1682), reaching a high point in Adam Smith's An Inquiry into the Nature and Causes of the Wealth of Nations (1776) and culminating with David Ricardo's Principles of Political Economy and Taxation (1817).

In particular, Marx's ideas about the forms of value were influenced by Samuel Bailey's criticism of Ricardo's theory of value. In Capital, Volume I, Marx stated that Bailey was one of the few political economists who had concerned themselves with the analysis of the form of value. Yet, Marx said, none of the political economists had understood its meaning, because they confused "the form of value" with "value itself", and because they only paid attention to the quantitative side of the phenomenon, not to the qualitative side. In Capital, Volume II, Marx criticizes Bailey again for "his general misunderstanding, according to which exchange-value equals value, the form of value is value itself", leading to the mistaken belief that "commodity values cease to be comparable once they no longer actively function as exchange-values, and cannot actually be exchanged for one another".

According to Marx, Aristotle already described the basics of the form of value when he argued that an expression such as "5 beds = 1 house" does not differ from "5 beds = such and such an amount of money", but according to Marx, Aristotle's analysis "suffered shipwreck" because he lacked a clear concept of value. By this Marx meant that Aristotle was unable to clarify the substance of value, i.e., what exactly was being equated in the value-comparisons when the relative worth of different goods is valued, or what was the common denominator commensurating a plethora of different goods for trading purposes. Aristotle thought the common factor must simply be the demand or need for goods, since without demand for goods that could satisfy some need or want, they would not be exchanged.

According to Marx, the substance of product-value is human labour-time in general, labour-in-the-abstract or "abstract labour". This value (an average current replacement cost in labour-time, based on the normal productivity of producers existing at the time) exists as an attribute of the products of human labour quite independently of the particular forms that exchange may take, though obviously value is always expressed in some form or other. It is perhaps not a very interesting insight if we consider only one commodity, but it is of much more interest when we face a huge variety of commodities which are all being traded, at the same time.

Preparatory writings

Marx's value-form idea can be traced back to his 1857 Grundrisse manuscript, where he contrasted communal production with production for exchange. Some humanist Marxists think the origin of the idea really goes further back in time, to Marx's 1844 Paris manuscripts, specifically the section on "the power of money" where Marx analyzes excerpts on money in Goethe's play Faust and Shakespeare's play Timon of Athens.

Marx felt that the playwrights had expressed the social meaning of money very well, and he discusses the magical power of money: why money can create a "topsy-turvy world" (verkehrte Welt) which unites opposites, fools people, or turns things into their contrary. However this textual interpretation is rejected by Althusserian Marxists, because of their separation of the stage of the "unscientific Young Marx" (1818-1845, from birth to age 27) from the stage of the "scientific Mature Marx" (1846-1883, from age 28 to age 65). According to Althusserians, these playwrights have nothing to do with value theory, because they belong only to the unscientific stage, and not to socialist realism or scientific socialism.

The form of value is also mentioned in Marx's 1859 book A Contribution to the Critique of Political Economy. It is clearly evident in his manuscript of Theories of Surplus Value (1861–63). In correspondence with Friedrich Engels in June 1867, Marx provided a first outline of his text on the form of value. Marx first explicitly described the concept in an appendix to the first (1867) edition of Capital, Volume I, but this appendix was dropped in a second edition, where the first chapter was rewritten (rather hurriedly) to include a special section on the form of value at the end.

Engels and Dühring

The first "value-form theorist" who interpreted the significance of Marx's idea was his friend Friedrich Engels, who argued in his Anti-Dühring polemic of 1878 (when Marx was still alive) that "The value form of products... already contains in embryo the whole capitalist form of production, the antagonism between capitalists and wage-workers, the industrial reserve army, crises..." Discussing the concept, origin and development of the form of value, Engels intended to demonstrate that real socialism involved the abolition of commodity production and the law of value, rather than their conscious integration in the economic system of a socialist commune, as Eugen Dühring proposed.

As discussed in this article below, in the first few years of the Russian revolution, the Bolsheviks and their theoreticians took that idea very literally. It was shelved during Lenin's New Economic Policy, but subsequently the CPSU set about eliminating almost all private enterprise and bringing almost all trade under state control. In a moral sense, commercial activity came to be seen as intrinsically bad, alienating, exploitative and oppressive, because it enabled some people to get rich from other people's work. The idea was, that once commerce was got rid of, this whole problem would no longer exist; the state would prevent all private accumulation, or at least it would be tolerated only on a very modest scale.

State-directed production seemed efficient and effective to the communist modernizers, especially in backward Russia. If infrastructure needed to be built, the state ordered it to be built, whether it made a profit or not. Business would never have built it, unless it made a sufficient profit at the end of a year. The central problem for the communists then was, that they had to get workers to cooperate and make sacrifices, to get things built, with promises of a better life in the future. The Party conceptualized this primarily as a matter of authority, education, ideological staunchness, exemplary practice, incentives, and penalties.

If workers did not cooperate, because they thought it was against their self-interest (for whatever reason), they were forced to do so, in peace-time as well as in war-time. Since workers resented this, producing things often became much less efficient, and output quality suffered. This caused endless management problems, and massive "policing" was required to ensure that things got done (as documented by Western historians like R. W. Davies and Donald A. Filtzer). Despite never-ending reforms and policy changes, the cooperation problem was never truly solved. There was a lot of cynicism about that in Soviet society, even when life gradually got better and living standards improved. On 30 October 2007, Russian President Vladimir Putin paid his respects to all the people killed under Stalin's dictatorship in the days of the Great Terror. Putin stated: "Hundreds of thousands, millions of people were killed and sent to camps, shot and tortured. These were people with their own ideas, which they were unafraid to speak out about. They were the cream of the nation."

The theoretical conflict between Engels and Dühring about the role of value in socialism resurfaced in the Soviet Union in the 1940s and 1950s. Until the 1930s, the Russian communists had generally expected that the categories of value and the law of value would disappear under socialism. Given that Joseph Stalin declared in 1936 that, with full state control over the whole economy, socialism had been achieved, it was logical to think that commodity production and the law of value no longer existed either. However, from 1941 this idea was in dispute.

Some Russian economists denied the existence of the law of value in the Soviet socialist republics, others affirmed its existence, and yet others said that the law existed in a "transformed" way.  In 1951, Stalin settled the matter by affirming officially that commodity production and the law of value did exist under socialism, with the implication, that the planning authorities should account properly for true labour costs, as the basis for correct pricing of products, assets and salaries. In that sense, Stalin in the end sided with Dühring against Engels. However, Stalin apparently claimed the law of value to be reduced mainly to the sphere of consumption. This can be reconciled  with Engels's idea of "labour certificates" that are stripped of the classic role of money, do not lead to extraction of surplus value, therefore being socialist. According to this view the law of value continues to operate but becomes socialist.

Issues of interpretation

Common difficulties
The difficulties Marxist academics often had with Marx's own texts about the concept of value is because, abstractly, "economic value" can refer at the same time to many different things:
1. The concept of value, like the concept of money prices, can be applied or linked to anything and everything, from the most abstract to the most specific phenomena, and so the talk about "value" can go anywhere, with an unlimited range, depending on what one has in mind. What Marx had in mind, was the political economists he was arguing with, but the 21st century reader is often not familiar with those.
2. Value has both quantitative and qualitative dimensions, which can be discussed separately, or combined in a measure. It often happens, that one knows definitely that something has a value, without being able to verify how much value it is.
3. The dimensions of value can be stated according to both absolute criteria ("the quantity of units of a quality X") and relative criteria ("the quantity of X which is equal to a quantity of Y").
4. Value itself can be expressed as (a) a subjective orientation or priority, (b) a relationship, ratio or proportional magnitude (c) an attributed characteristic of an object or subject, (4) an object or subject in its own right, or (5) a movement in a temporal sequence or in a space (the value of a good that exists at point A can change, if it is transferred to point B).
5. The concept of value assumes principles which define or explain how we know that there exists (i) comparable value, (ii) value equivalence, (iii) value decrease, (iv) value increase, (v) conserved value, (vi) transferred value, (vii) negative value, (viii) positive value, (ix) value destroyed, and (x) newly created value.  For economists all this may be "self-evident", but for statisticians, accountants, valuers and auditors it certainly is not.
6. Value can refer to an actual value manifested in a real transaction, property right or transfer, or it can refer to an ideal value (a derived measure or a theoretical construct which is perhaps extrapolated from observations about the actual values of assets and transactions). It could refer to the actual value realized, or to the value that could be realized under certain conditions or circumstances.
7. Values and prices, as actual or theoretical magnitudes, may not be so easy to distinguish from each other. For example, an ordinary accounting category such as "value-added" in fact consists of a sum of prices calculated according to assumed standard conditions (a uniform valuation).
8. If goods are said to be "overvalued" or "undervalued", this assumes that one can reliably and accurately identify what the "true value" is. Yet the true value may only be hypothetical, since its definition depends on market conditions, and on the particular vantage point (or assumptions) adopted.
9. The concept of value, like the concept of prices, is often used in a rather "loose" sense - referring to a cost or expense, a compensation, a yield or return, an asset valuation etc. The language of trade often does not make the social, legal and economic relations involved in trade very explicit.
10. In the course of Marx's dialectical story, the meaning of the category of value itself evolves and develops, with increasingly finer distinctions, and the concept is used in somewhat different senses in different places. Since Marx did not finish a large part of his manuscript for publication, it is not always exactly clear from the text what he intends. The English translations may not get it exactly right.

So from the use of the expression "value" it may therefore not be immediately obvious what kind of valuation or expression is being referred to, it depends on the theoretical context. 
Ladislaus von Bortkiewicz, the originator of the famous "transformation problem" controversy, claimed confidently that in Marx's text, "the context always reveals clearly which value is meant". Nevertheless, there have been very lengthy academic debates about what Marx really did mean in particular passages. Rigorously investigated, the concept of "value" turns out not to be a "neat-and-tidy accounting concept" that can be manipulated with mathematical precision; it can be manipulated with mathematical precision only if a series of definitions are already fixed and assumed (it is a fuzzy concept).

At the end of his life, David Ricardo had to "conclude, rather sadly, that 'there is no such thing in nature as a perfect measure of value'... there is no such thing as an invariable standard of value". In Marx's Capital, it is understood from the start that there cannot be an invariable standard of value even in principle (this logically follows from the analysis of the form of value). Although there are absolute limits to the formation of value, value is in essence a relative magnitude, which has no absolute constant in time and space. If a standard of value such as gold is adopted (which Marx does), this is done only for the sake of argument, and for the sake of simplicity of exposition or reckoning (in the era in which Marx lived, there was very little price inflation).

Orthodox economics typically takes it for granted, that the exchange processes on which markets are based already exist and will occur, and that prices already exist, or can be imputed. This is often called the "gross substitution axiom" by economists: the implication of this theorem is thatall products are, in principle, supposed to be mutually interchangeable with all other products, and therefore the "price mechanism" can allocate resources in such a way, that market equilibria are assured by the laws of supply and demand. This assumption is overturned only in special cases, where markets still must be brought into being and a process of "price discovery" takes place. In modern economics, the "value" of something is defined either as a money-price, or as a personal (subjective) valuation, and the exchangeability of products as such presents no special problem; it normally does not merit any special inquiry since exchangeability as such is taken for granted (in the real world, it is not strictly true that any good can be traded for any other good, for legal, logistic and technical reasons).

In conventional economics, money serves as a medium of exchange to minimize the transaction costs of barter among utility-maximizing individuals. Such an approach is very different from Marx's historical interpretation of the formation of value. In Marx's theory, the "value" of a product is something separate and distinct from the "price" it happens to fetch (goods can sell for more or less than they are worth, i.e., they are not necessarily worth what they happen to sell for).

Problematic

Marx's value-form analysis intends to answer the question of how the value-relationships of products are expressed in ways that acquire an objective existence in their own right (ultimately as relationships between quantities of money, or money-prices), what the modalities of these relationships are, and how these product-values can change, independently of the valuers who trade in them. Marx argued that neither the classical political economists nor the vulgar economists who succeeded them were able to explain satisfactorily how that worked, resulting in serious theoretical errors.

The political economists sought in vain for an invariable standard of value, and proposed theories of money which were hardly plausible. The reason behind the errors was — according to Marx — that, as market trade developed, the economic relationship between commodity-values and money increasingly appeared in an inverted, reified way. In reality, economic value symbolizes a social relationship between human subjects, as reflected by a thing or expressed by the relationship between things. Yet it often seems more like value is the thing which creates the social relationship. To understand the real causal relationships, not just economic calculation, but also an historical and sociological understanding of the subject was needed.

In vulgar Marxist economics, the commodity is simply a combination of use-value and exchange-value. That is not Marx's own argument. As he explains in Capital, Volume III, in an overall sense business competition among producers centres precisely on the discrepancies between the socially established values of commodities in production and their particular exchange-values manifested in the marketplace. Goods could be traded above or below their value, and that mattered for profits. Marx believed that correctly distinguishing between the form and content of value was essential for the logical coherence of a labour theory of product-value, and he criticized Adam Smith specifically because Smith:

Smith had affirmed that labour is "the real measure of the exchangeable value of all commodities", but, as David Ricardo subsequently argued, Smith's definition confused the labour embodied in a commodity when it was produced, with the labour commanded by the commodity when it was exchanged. Marx believed that Smith and Ricardo were certainly right to identify labour as the substance of commodity value, but Marx realized early on that the definitions of both these political economists could not be correct. The fundamental reason for that was, that both economists mixed up "value" with "exchange value" and with "price" (and also mixed up actual prices with theoretical prices). That is, they mixed up the forms and substance of value, because they failed to distinguish correctly between them as qualitatively different things.

The labour theory of product-value could, Marx argued, be made coherent and consistent, only when it was understood that product-values, prices of production and the market prices of commodities could vary independently of each other. Product-values did not necessarily have anything to do in a direct way with the relationship between cost-prices and sale-prices determining the actual profitability of enterprises, because both inputs and outputs could be profitably traded at prices above or below their value, depending on the amount of sales turnover and the state of the market in a given time interval. It was more that the normal labour requirements for supplying products in the end set limits to the price-range and the terms on which the products could be commercially traded.

Althusserian interpretation

The form of value is often regarded as a difficult, obscure or even esoteric idea by scholars (the "holy grail" of Marxism). Simon Clarke commented in 1989 that "the value debates of the last few years have become ever-more esoteric." John Weeks referred in 2010 to the "essentially esoteric nature of Marx's scientific investigation of value", meaning talk about unobservables. There has been considerable debate about the real theoretical significance of the value-form concept.

Marx himself started off the controversy when he emphasized that Capital, Volume I was not difficult to understand, "with the exception of the section on the form of value." In his "Preface to Capital Vol. 1," the French philosopher Louis Althusser mimicked Marx, and pronounced that:

Althusser's suggestions were taken up by many New Left Marxists, which meant that Marx's theory of the form of value and its significance was rarely taught. Paresh Chattopadhyay states that "very few writers in the Anglo-American tradition of Marx studies have paid attention to Marx's crucial analysis of value form". However, Marx very deliberately and explicitly made an effort to state his interpretation of commodity trade with absolute clarity in his first chapters. Marx aims to demonstrate that the "labour theory of value" that guided the classical political economists in interpreting the economy cannot be correct, because the concept of economic value itself is misconstrued.

Marx never referred to his own theory of value as a "labour theory of value" even once, knowing very well (as indicated by his analysis of bank credit) that the value of many assets is not determined by labour-time. The ideas of the political economists had to be modified very considerably, before the theory of value could truly make sense. However, when the modifications were carried out, the previous understanding of capitalist economic life was also overturned. Hence Marx's own theory showed at the same time both continuities with the classical tradition, and radical discontinuities. This has been the cause of numerous controversies about the extent to which Marx broke with, or accepted, the previous theories of the political economists about economic value.

Fetishism

The theory of the forms of value is the basis for Marx's concept of commercial fetishism or economic reification. This is about how the independent powers acquired by the value of tradeable objects (and by market relationships) are reflected back into human thought, and more specifically into the theories of the political economists about the market economy. Marx himself never used the expression "commodity fetishism" as a general category (Warenfetishismus), rather he referred to the fetish(-ism) of commodities, money and capital. All kinds of objects of value could be "fetishized".

In Althusserian theory, however, this meaning is unknown, because Althusserian theory detaches the concept of "fetishism" from the concept of the form of value. In the Marxist–Leninist tradition of positivist science, Althusser regarded Marx's dramatic, theatrical and theological metaphors as "unscientific" coquetry, lacking objectivity. Almost none of the New Left discussions of commodity fetishism refer to Marx's value-form analysis in any analytical depth.

In the reified perception of the political economists and the vulgar Marxists, products have value because they are expressible in money-prices, but Marx argues that in reality it is just the other way round: because commodities have value, i.e. because they are all products with a replacement cost of social labour,  their values can be expressed by generally accepted money-prices, accurately or not.

The true relationship can, according to Marx, be traced out only when the historical evolution of economic exchange is considered from its most simple beginnings to its most developed forms. The end-result of market development is a fully monetized economy (a "cash economy", although bankcards nowadays replace banknotes and coins), but how its workings appear to the individual at the micro-level, is often different or the inverse of its causal dynamic at the macro-level. According to Marx, this creates a lot of confusions in economic theorizing.

One aim of Marx's theory is to explain how the nature of the market economy itself shapes the way that people will perceive it. The secret of the form of value is, that the form in which the value of products is expressed (as a relationship between traded objects), simultaneously obscures and hides the substance of the value of products. It obscures how the value of products is formed, and the social relations between people that exist behind the relationship between things.

Knowing what the social substance of value is, in fact, completely unnecessary for the purpose of trade. All that is required to navigate the market, is knowledge of cost prices, sale prices, price averages and whether prices are going up or down. The conflation of value with exchange value, with price and with money grows spontaneously out of the relations of commodity trade themselves.

Criticism

Ecology
The ecological Marxist Paul Burkett has tried to create a "value-form approach" to understanding the relationship between capitalism and nature. He argues that:

By contrast, Elmar Altvater argued that an ecological critique of political economy "hinges on an analysis of use-value".

Focusing on the human metabolism with nature, Kohei Saito argued in 2017 that:

John Bellamy Foster stated in 2018 that:

Harry Rothman stated in his 1972 book Murderous Providence that:

Women's studies
In chapter 8 of her radical 1977 critique of Freudian theory, This sex which is not one, Luce Irigaray examined in some detail the relationship between Marx's story about the form of value of commodities, phallocracy and kinship systems. She argued that "Marx's analysis of commodities as the elementary form of capitalist wealth can... [also] be understood as an interpretation of the status of woman in so-called patriarchal societies." Specifically, "all the systems of exchange that organize patriarchal societies and all the modalities of productive work that are recognized, valued, and rewarded in these societies are men's business."  When women are managed, farmed out and traded by men, women's bodies can become a manipulable abstraction. As commodities, Irigaray argued, women become "utilitarian objects and bearers of value". A mother becomes a use value; a virgin becomes an exchange value; and a prostitute becomes both a use-value and exchange value. The issues are about freedom, human dignity, social valuations, exploitation and oppression.

Irigaray did not necessarily mean that all women literally are commodities, but that (1) they are often de facto treated "as if" they are tradeable wares, (2) women are frequently subjected to all kinds of informal trade-offs, to obtain what they need, (3) the commodity form sinks deeply into the human psyche and intimate relations, creating a transactional mentality which is oppressive. Irigaray raised the question, of what would become of the social order, without the exploitation of women. People would be "socializing in a different way in relation to nature, matter, the body, language, and desire".

Though Irigaray's story had impact when it was first published, its appeal did not last. Among other things, her story is too grim and somber.  The psychoanalytic model of human nature is no longer widely accepted. Women generally are not regarded just as commodities or victims, they have legal rights, and they have considerable power and control, individually and collectively. Although a "battle of the sexes" continues (competition), men and women also need each other and depend on each other (cooperation). So, in the real world (in contrast to the academic imaginary), "male domination" has definite limits, and women do fight back.

Most of all, it was rather unclear from Irigaray's story, what exactly would be the most effective methods to create better human relations, and how men and women could successfully work together to put them into practice. Often Irigaray seemed to be writing more at a spiritual level, and readers could take out of it what they liked. A postmodern Marxist reading of the form of value is offered by Katja Diefenbach. In her critical analysis of Islamic hijab in Iran, Professor Rebecca Ruth Gould claims that "The exchange value dimension to the commodity form crucially structures the hijab-as-commodity".

Marxist women and men have often argued that women's housework, shopping work, child-raising and volunteer work is neither highly valued economically nor very visible in bourgeois ideology, precisely because it is itself not paid and charged for, as a job. The so-called "non-market" activity of women does not even register in national accounts, although its imputed market value (estimated from time-use surveys and occupational data) is very large. The values and valuations involved in women's "non-market" work are often quite different from commercial values. So capitalist market value and women's own valuations can clash, in various settings. Kathi Weeks and Kristin Ghodsee provide an overview of the modern debates.

The general implication is, that if a lot of what women do is not very highly valued (because it does not really make money, etc.), then women's social status also suffers - they aren't equals with men in the real world. In principle or in theory, capitalism is quite compatible with complete equality between men and women, with acknowledgement of essential differences between women and men. Indeed, formally speaking, all citizens in the West have the same rights in the marketplace, and equal status under the justice system. But in practice, capitalist society is a class society, structured by a market competition between unequally-positioned market actors. Faced by competitors, people will focus on where they are strongest themselves, and they will attack rivals precisely where rivals are the weakest and most vulnerable.

The usual overall effect is, that those who are already in the weakest position, will lose out the most; those in the strongest position can use their strength, to get even stronger. This general result is mitigated only by love and desire (including mimetic desire), charity, philanthropy, government provisions, trade unions, credit unions, and social justice advocacy groups (or political parties). Individual cases can contradict the statistical patterns of inequality, but the statistical patterns of inequality for whole populations are quite persistent. This is very important to women, not just because they want to have the same civil rights as men, but because socio-economic inequality has very bad effects on bearing and raising children.

Erosion of the value-form and energy
After the global financial crisis of 2007–2009, more Western Marxist theorists and post-Marxists are discussing the spectre of the break-up and supersession of the value-form. Peter Kennedy claims that a "transition in social labour" and an "erosion of the value form" is occurring. Simply put, the theory of the "breaking up of the forms of value" means that:
All kinds of markets can no longer function as they should (they become dysfunctional, inefficient and ineffective from the point of view of supplying what people need or want). Therefore, they give rise to non-market methods to obtain resources.
In practice, the terms on which market trade can take place, are more and more strongly shaped by non-market influences at work in business competition, gaining access to resources, and deal-making. If you are an "insider", you can be a winner. If you are an "outsider" you are likely to be a loser. This tends to erode market freedoms.
Pricing goods, services and assets no longer reflects true supply costs in money terms – exchanges of products, services and assets begin to occur more and more on all kinds of different terms, and not simply cash value. Therefore, monetary valuations no longer express the real valuations being made; non-monetary considerations are involved as well. A discrepancy is created, between the formal appearance of a transaction, and what really occurs informally.

The general result would be, that the market allocation of resources by standardized prices is displaced, combined, or replaced with non-market allocation principles – all kinds of "deals" can be organized, in which money is only one consideration, among many.

Gaining access to resources is, in that case, no longer simply a matter of having sufficient money in one's pocket to buy them. Money alone can no longer guarantee access to resources. It all depends on what kind of cooperation one can get, to clinch some kind of deal. If, for any reason, people do not cooperate, there is no deal. Successful trading then depends more and more on what kind of human (or political) relations there are between people who want to obtain something, and people who offer to supply something.

In the history of trade, markets have of course broken down plenty of times. So this phenomenon is not at all new. But the argument is, that the phenomenon is inevitably happening globally on a larger and larger scale in the long term, so that the whole functioning of capitalism is altered in a structural way. Economists might compute all kinds of complex price calculations for their econometric models, but, it is argued, those calculations can no longer adequately explain the way in which resources are really allocated in the economy. Money-prices may have less and less to do with that.

Ten broad trends can be mentioned that point in the direction of an erosion of the forms of value.

Market corrosion

The British post-Marxist journalist Paul Mason claimed in The Guardian that "Without us noticing, we are entering the postcapitalist era". Part of that shift, he claimed, is that "information is corroding the market's ability to form prices correctly… because markets are based on scarcity while information is abundant. (…) whole swaths of economic life are beginning to move to a different rhythm." Dave Elder-Vass states that "...vast swathes of the economy, including the gift, collaborative and hybrid forms... coexist with more conventional capitalism in the new digital economy." Jeremy Rifkin states that the internet of things can facilitate an economic shift from markets to a collaborative commons, with near-zero marginal costs of production.

There is a lot of "free stuff" available these days that people can get hold of very fast – if they know their way around information. They can often share it very quickly too, all around the world – bypassing markets, money and laws. When information is shared, givers and receivers both have the information, unlike the ownership transfer of an alienable commodity. If people can get a lot of goods for free, it is going to be more difficult to sell things to them. In turn, that disturbs ordinary commercial trading, pricing and market functioning, so that "information corrodes value."

By contrast, however, the Hayekian Viktor Mayer-Schönberger is optimistic about the potential for "information-rich" markets. Not only can the internet of things link people and commodities very accurately and quickly. The new technology can also police people's property rights, and their market behaviour, creating the possibility of responding to it in real time. New rules, such as the Directive on Copyright in the Digital Single Market in the European Union, could block the "free stuff".

Harvard philosopher Michael Sandel stated that "Without being fully aware of the shift, Americans have drifted from having a market economy to becoming a market society ... where almost everything is up for sale ... a way of life where market values seep into almost every sphere of life and sometimes crowd out or corrode important values, nonmarket values." In this case, market values are not corroded by non-market values, but non-market values are corroded by market values.

The economist Kenneth Arrow explained, that markets require human trust to operate effectively, but that this trust may not be spontaneously generated by market activity itself:

If it is accepted, that non-market values are corroded by market values, as Sandel claims, then a "social structure" inspired by healthy moral virtues and just laws is also corroded. In turn, that would then increase the scope of opportunism and corruption in trading activity, thereby reducing the trust that is vital for efficient market trade. International trust levels are nowadays surveyed by StrategyOne's Edelman Trust Barometer. John Authers, a senior investment columnist and editor with the Financial Times and Bloomberg News, stated in 2018 that:

The counterargument is, that trade on the basis of some deceit or dishonesty creates reputational risk. Dubious deals can mean that people go elsewhere to buy and sell stuff (if they have that choice), leaving shady traders without customers or suppliers. Honest trade and dishonest trade have always co-existed, despite policing by the state, but the gloomy point is, that it has become uncertain which of the two is likely to prevail in the future.

Loss of value

Since the 2007-2009 global financial crisis, there is growing concern about whether there are any types of assets left in the world, which can reliably hold their value. A gold standard for currencies is gone. Currency exchange rates can fluctuate very considerably, altering local prices. Global indebtedness continues to grow at a much faster rate than global value-added, accompanied by a sequence of financial bubbles that cause economic havoc and devalue assets when they burst. For the period 1970–2011, IMF researchers identified 147 systemic banking crises, 211 currency crises and 55 sovereign debt crises. Very low interest rates hurt bank profits; but at interest rates below the rate of price inflation, bank clients lose money just by keeping it in the bank. In the US, Robinhood co-CEO Baiju Bhatt stated: "It's more expensive to have less money in this country. We think that's wrong." Although people become reluctant to do anything with their savings, from a financial point of view they should keep trading, to maintain value, or increase it.

In mid-2016, Fitch Ratings estimated that, although the global economy had recovered, there were now $11.7 trillion worth of investments in bonds carrying negative interest rates in real terms, representing almost half of all sovereign bonds issued in developed countries. In November 2018, Bloomberg News commented about a "brutal global market":
 The financial press spoke of a "credit rout": credit markets had scored "the worst year since the global financial crisis" with yields on stocks, bonds and commodities all in retreat, often turning negative. High-yield and investment-grade notes were headed "for losses in both euros and dollars", the first time all four asset classes "posted negative total returns since 2008, based on Bloomberg Barclays indexes". U.S. investment-grade bonds "posted negative total returns of 3.71 percent in 2018". Morgan Stanley calculated that, for the first time since the 1970s, the yields for 21 major asset classes were negative for 2018 across the world, in real terms. Morgan Stanley judged that cash (meaning bank deposits and very short term bonds) was the best-performing asset class in 2018.

Michael Hudson noted that in mid-2018 US Treasury notes were approaching an inverted yield curve - the yields for short-term US Treasury bills almost outstripped long-term ones. Hudson said, that investors increasingly had no confidence in the economy, and just wanted "to park their money safely". The real economy wasn't growing, the only thing that was growing was debts. JP Morgan data showed that the global yield curve for bonds had already inverted (the difference in yields for bonds with 1 to 3 year maturities and those with 7 to 10 year maturities reduced to zero). The Financial Times stated that "global quantitative easing has created a seemingly insatiable demand for five- to 10-year Treasuries, pushing down yields". Others argued that the yield curve was not yet inverted, just flat. Morgan Stanley data showed that, in 2018, foreign institutions were putting US$100 billion into Chinese government bonds. The first true inversion in the US was observed in December 2018, when the yield on five-year US Treasury notes fell below that on two-year ones. A short time later, the difference in yield between 2-year and 10-year Treasury notes (the definitive indicator) dropped below ten basis points. The Wall Street Journal advised investors explicitly not to panic, because the phenomenon could just be a "temporary kink" which had "no predictive power"

The broader question which Michael Hudson raised, was about why this weird thing could happen at all, and what it says about the condition that the major part of US business is in, the mentality of investors, etc. In the US, recessions and depressions since World War II (so far 11 downturns in total, on average occurring every 6.6 years) are usually preceded by an inverted yield curve for Treasury notes (within an average time-frame of 21 months). Billionaire investor Stan Druckenmiller stated, in September 2018, that the next financial crisis would likely be worse than the last one, because of skyrocketing debt loads. "We have this massive debt problem. We tripled down on what caused the [last] crisis. And we tripled down on it globally." Following this type of expectation, many investors put their money into government bonds, even if the real yield on the bonds was close to zero, or negative.

In the crash of 2007–2009, the property values of US homes dropped by about 30% on average, and around one in every five mortgaged homes was suddenly "under water" (where the loaned amount was at least 25% higher, than the estimated market value of the home - in the "normal" situation, at most 1 out of 50 mortgaged homes would be "underwater"). Between 2007 and 2016 there were 7.8 million foreclosures of mortgaged homes in the US, where households under financial pressure were forced out. This was equivalent to around one quarter of all mortgaged homes. Subsequently, the housing market recovered. Yet ten years later, more than 5 million American mortgaged homes (around one in ten owner-occupied mortgaged homes) were still seriously "underwater".

New School researchers found that, between the spring of 2009 and the fall of 2011, about 45 percent of the US workers they studied saw their retirement account-balances decrease by thousands of dollars. For many workers, renewed gains in pension funds after the financial crash of 2008 could only partly offset the losses. In the old capitalism, working people were rewarded for saving money, but in the new financialized capitalism, they are often punished for saving. There is no certainty anymore what exactly their savings will be worth, when they retire. What is certain is that the current generation of US pensioners is the first one since World War II which is financially worse off than the preceding generation. The situation in Europe and Japan is much the same.

Price volatility

Price volatility can be a boon to speculators (if the trend goes their way), but to many business people it is a pain, as became clear for example in the Brexit controversy. Much of global production is now subject to intellectual property rights (IPRs), yet the commercial value of knowledge, data and information can be volatile. IPRs are often difficult to defend against raiders, when people's privacy is destroyed. Knowledge and information can not only spike in value, but also quickly become worthless. Many financial products now exist, such as level 3 assets and cryptocurrencies, of which the exact value is unknown or highly variable. Global market volatility can rapidly wipe out trillions of dollars of value. Financial Times editor Gillian Tett reported that:

Stock market volatility is measured by the VIX (the CBOE Volatility Index), colloquially known as the "fear index" or the "fear gauge". The financial community and the political class try to do their best to maintain the stability of society, but they cannot fully control what all the people and all the markets are going to do. For example, a majority of Brits unexpectedly voted for a Brexit, throwing a spanner in the works. After 28 January 2018, about $4 trillion worth of stock value in stock markets disappeared in little more than a week, although the stock markets subsequently recovered.

For well-insured rich people, it may not be so devastating if they lose part of their capital (they can often recover it within a few years, using the capital they still have), but the worry is what sudden, very large losses can do to the world economy. The magnitude and negative impact of price volatility on trade (including foreign exchange rates) is usually greater in less developed (poorer) countries, because they lack a sophisticated financial system, hedging facilities to reduce currency risks, and financial buffers to cope with sudden, major changes in prices.

Thomas Hobbes, writing his Leviathan in the 17th century, remarked that:

In a digitalized, globalized 21st century world, buzzing with possibilities to connect or disconnect, people may start to regard themselves – seriously or surrealistically – as a kind of "stock" in the social marketplace, with a rather volatile value, which goes up and down all the time – whether they like that, or not. Depending on the public or private perceptions of what they do or don't do with themselves, their value goes up, or it goes down, and it can do so more or less instantly. The value of a person who is an outlier could go up and down like a yoyo, because the process of price discovery is difficult. This can become a challenge, causing uncertainty, discomfort or ambivalence, if it is difficult to control or evade. It creates pressures to "manage" the impressions that other people have (see also impression management). It could affect the way people dress, where they go, who they connect with, and so on, all of which could influence perceptions of their "worth", and consequently whether they get endorsements or rejections.

All these forms of "price volatility" suggest, that there is a dimension of "value" now gaining prominence, which is to an important extent unpredictable, capricious, uncontrollable and elusive, tricking even the most powerful government institutions at times. The sociologist Zygmunt Bauman refers to a new era of "liquid modernity", which alters the whole way in which individuals see themselves, and their relationship with others and the world.

Unreliable valuations

To defeat competitors, dodge taxes and please investors, businesses increasingly fiddle their accounts and hide parts of their operations. Aided by multiple subsidiary or associated companies - often sited in different countries - company holdings, earnings and operations can be "tweaked": liabilities can be turned into assets, assets into liabilities; incomes can be turned into costs, and costs into incomes; and operating cash flows can be altered – according to the kind of accounting method that is most favourable for the business group (see also creative accounting). In 2004, Trevor S. Harris, a chief accounting analyst at Morgan Stanley stated that "The financial reporting system is completely broken." This begins to upset the traditional economic rationality of costs and benefits in market activity (in particular, it becomes legally possible to get rich through debt leverage which indebts other people).

If the value of a company to investors is defined as the present value of future cash flows, it is not primarily what the company has achieved financially in the present that is important, but what that achievement is "likely" to be worth in the future. This motivates companies to present attractive numbers to investors. In Australia, the Financial Review reported in 2016 that 40% of ASX top-500 companies use "non-standard" financial measures such as "underlying profit" and "underlying earnings", calling into question the very purpose of having uniform accounting standards. KPMG researchers found that many ASX200 companies were not fully complying with government guidelines for reporting financial data to investors. Similar stories can be found in most other countries. The Financial Times quoted a boardmember of an auditing firm as saying that "The problem with fair value accounting is that it's very hard to differentiate between mark-to-market, mark-to-model and mark-to-myth."

Through stock buybacks a company can drive up its share price, and deliver earnings to shareholders without any change in company performance - if corporate officers get paid in stocks and stock options, they get a pay rise every time the stock's value rises. In February 2018, the US Senate Democrats released a special report which stated that a sample of just 33 corporations were planning $209 billion worth of buybacks in 2018, while at the same time laying off large numbers of workers. According to Goldman Sachs, US companies authorized $1 trillion worth of stock buybacks in 2018, while Europe, Canada, Japan and industrialized East Asian countries also got into the act with a combined $248 billion of buyouts in the first half of 2018. The global equity market was "shrinking at the fastest pace in at least two decades" although its total value was still increasing, partly due to buybacks pushing up stock prices. The Financial Times raised the spectre of the "slow death of public stock markets"':

The general effect is, that the true economic value or benefit of what business does, becomes more difficult to know; transparency is lacking. Shareholders are encouraged to have faith in a company, although there may in truth exist no reliable valuation of company operations. In October 2010, the EU dropped the idea of a financial transactions tax (a Tobin tax or Robin Hood tax), citing among its reasons the bewildering complexity of international transactions, which makes implementing and enforcing the tax far too difficult and costly.

The commons

The ordinary capitalist logic fails to provide any agreed standard valuation, or property right, for new kinds of "semi-public" goods that are considered to have a lot of economic value, such as social networks, collective intellectual and cultural assets,  eco-systems, and stocks of non-renewable natural resources. These resources are often called "the commons" (nobody owns them, or everybody owns them, so therefore somebody can take them).

Realistic pricing by business presumes that things can be privately owned and sold (or leased, rented, hired etc.). If resources can be obtained and used without cost (because they are "free goods") or accessible at near-zero cost, they are more likely to be plundered or wasted. For example, in the Pacific Ocean, there are a lot of fish in the open sea, nobody owns them, and they are harvested using industrial fishing techniques with giant dragnets. The result is, that fish stocks are decreasing very fast (see also Fishing down the food web). The feasibility of generating new fish populations depends on whether the food chain on which the fish depend is still there.

The invention of an ingenious system of global carbon emissions trading, which priced carbon emissions, and promoted trade in pollution allowances to reduce pollution in the air that we breathe, failed to reach its goal. For the year 2015, health experts estimated conservatively that 9 million premature deaths in the world (that is 16% of all the deaths that occur in the world per year, i.e. 4 deaths out of every 25 deaths per year) were attributable to pollution, with air pollution being the biggest killer. The biggest numbers of pollution deaths occur in Africa, China, India, Pakistan and Bangladesh. Only around 155,000 Americans die from pollution per year (out of 2.7 million deaths per year, i.e. about 1 pollution death in every 17 deaths per year) - in the West, the pollution problem "dropped off the radar", as the focus was on global warming.

Network sites such as Facebook and LinkedIn do not make their money directly from having access to other people's friendships, but from selling information, advertising, broadcasting, games, sponsorships and access privileges. The Facebook–Cambridge Analytica data scandal indicated that the for-profit, legalized robbery and exploitation of information about people's known personal networks - amongst other things to dupe them into voting for right-wing politicians - has become a big business internationally. Gigantic data thefts nowadays occur every year, but the victims may never know that their data and work was stolen, or who stole it. In 2016, it was reported that an estimated 4 billion data records were stolen by hackers. However, when people sign up for accounts with Google, Amazon, Facebook, Microsoft etc. they have no idea of what their personal data (trillions of records) are going to be used for. People often don't even know how to protect their own data or their own privacy, other than not to use their computer. Corporations can legally "scrape" gigantic amounts of personal information, and do with it what they like - people will probably never know what happened, and they cannot find out what happened, even if they tried.

Misvaluation of work

The rewards and valuations for work effort, trade unionists complain, have gone way out of proportion, so that many people work extremely hard for long hours, just to earn a few dollars, while others get paid gigantic sums of money just to have a chat, to be present, or to give a bit of attention. 
A US study published in May 2018 by Minnesota's Democratic US congressman Keith Ellison found that the average CEO-to-worker pay ratio had reached 339 to 1, with the highest pay gap approaching 5,000 to 1 (for every dollar an ordinary worker earns, a CEO on average gets $339 and can earn close to $5,000).
According to Martin A. Sullivan, chief economist with Tax Analysts, "The way you get rich in this world is not by working hard. It's by owning large amounts of assets and having those things appreciate in value." The argument is here not that CEO's "do not work hard", but that they and other wealthy people could never accumulate all the wealth that they do, simply from their own salary. The wealth accumulates faster, through wealth managers leveraging and trading personal assets for profit and capital gain. "Little of Jeff Bezos’ and Bill Gates's wealth, for instance, came from wages, salaries, and benefits... It came from owning stock". Martin Wolf stated in 2018 that "If the natural tendency of our economies is towards ever-rising rent extraction and inequality, with all its dire social and political results, we need to respond in a thoughtful and determined way. That is the great challenge."
Kevin Bales reports that "for the first time in human history, there is an absolute glut of potential slaves... with so many possible slaves, their value has plummeted. Slaves are now so cheap, that they have become cost-effective in many new kinds of work. (...) Slaveholders get all the work they can out of their slaves, and then throw them away." In 2017, the ILO estimated conservatively that across 2011–2016, 89 million people (roughly equal to the population of Germany or the Democratic Republic of Congo) were enslaved worldwide for shorter or longer intervals of time, 25 million were permanently subject to forced labour, 15 million females were enslaved in a forced marriage, and 152 million children aged between 5 and 17 were subjected to child labour. There are estimated to be about 400,000 slaves in the United States. Of all slaves, two out of three are female (see also Global Slavery Index).
James Crotty argues that top executives in the financial world nowadays get richly rewarded regardless of whether there is a crash or a boom. Since they just keep getting huge bonus payments, even when their own company suffers very large losses, they are "perversely incentivized" to continue the high-risk and high-leverage investment strategies which destabilize the financial system as a whole. Yet even if CEO's would take a drastic pay cut, the fact remains that total debt levels are escalating regardless, and require more and more earnings from any source, to pay more and more interest on loans - which pits private investors against central banks when the banks try to raise rates.

The argument then is, that if the financial incentives and disincentives for work effort have gone totally out of kilter, markets cannot deliver a fair and efficient allocation of resources anymore.

Market failure

Governments are involved more and more in sorting out market failure (and pick up the tab for it - see also lemon socialism). An editor of the Financial Times, Martin Wolf, remarked famously about the financial sector that "No [other] industry has a comparable talent for privatising gains and socialising losses." Some years later, he explained that "Today's banks represent the incarnation of profit-seeking behaviour taken to its logical limits, in which the only question asked by senior staff is not what is their duty or their responsibility, but what can they get away with." Yet the role of bank services is crucial to operate gigantic transaction volumes, and governments have fewer and fewer resources available to repair business damage, because of privatization, state corruption, and the looting of state funds or tax-dodging by private interests (kickbacks, privatization, pork barrel politics, lobby group power, corporatization, securitization, rent-seeking, arbitrary budget cuts, financial bailouts, regressive tax, tax evasion etc.).

People across the world are now literally being priced out of markets, not just in poor countries, but also in rich countries. 
According to a McKinsey Global report, "In the United States, 40 percent of adults surveyed by the Federal Reserve System said they would struggle to cover an unexpected expense of $400. One-quarter of nonretired adults have no pension or retirement savings. Outstanding student loans now top $1.4 trillion, exceeding credit-card debt—and unlike nearly all other forms of debt, they cannot be discharged in bankruptcy."
In San Francisco, well-paid teachers are living in dorms, because they cannot afford to buy a home in the city anymore - house prices have gone beyond their reach. This is the reverse situation of what happened in the property boom up to 2007. At that time, quite a few Californian teachers found they could make more money from rising property values, than from their job. In 2017, only half of the households in California owned their homes, but one out of every three renters - roughly six million people - paid more than half of their total income to their landlord. In Los Angeles, tenants staged a rent strike in protest. 
Richard Florida reported in 2017 that "An acre of central land in New York City is worth approximately 72 times more than an acre of central Atlanta or Pittsburgh, and almost 1,400 times more than the same in many small Rust Belt and Sunbelt metros."
On behalf of many of the world's large cities, the mayor of Barcelona called on the United Nations to do something to help stop real estate speculators from driving up the cost of housing. The Cities for Adequate Housing statement signed by mayors of eight big cities calls for more powers for local authorities, to better regulate the real estate market; more funds to improve public housing stock; more tools to co-produce alternative public-private and community-driven housing solutions; urban planning schemes that combine adequate housing and quality neighborhoods that are both inclusive and sustainable; and city council cooperation in residential strategies. 
Although on average people are now living longer than they did before, the 2017 Global Medical Trends Survey Report by Willis Towers Watson states that "The cost of medical care continues to rise across the globe with no light at the end of the tunnel." Americans like to see themselves as the most advanced nation on earth, but to get the same medical care and cover as Europeans, Americans spend 2.5 times more money; Americans have the highest medical bills on earth.
In 2016, New Zealand researchers reported that during 2013, at least one in every 100 New Zealanders was de facto homeless, compared with 1 in 120 in 2006, and 1 in 130 in 2001. They sleep at a friend's place or with relatives, in motels, garages, sheds, cars, stations etc. At that time, in 2016, the country was at the top of Knight Frank's global ranking of countries for property price-rises, and for the first time, the average house price in Auckland hit NZ$1 million (=US$715,000, €585,000, £513,000). The median NZ salary was at US$35,000, meaning that the average Auckland house price was around 20x the median annual salary or around 10x median household income. Average Auckland house prices are expected to increase 300% in twenty years, and reach NZ$3 million by 2036.

The warped price structures of financialized capitalism increasingly cause large social dislocations and technical change across the world, because it is no longer economically possible for large masses of people to live and work in the normal way, within large geographic areas. They have to change their lifestyle drastically, or are forced out.
The rich buy up the beautiful areas, and the poor have to live in the ugly, derelict and polluted areas. As rich people cause the largest amount of pollution, many poor people take a dim view of bourgeois environmentalism aiming to protect nature.

Yet great poverty can also be destructive for the environment. Suffering hyperinflation of the Zimbabwean dollar and absolute poverty, masses of people in Zimbabwe took to cutting down forest, wildlife poaching and gold or diamond mining on own initiative, to make a living and survive (See also Marange diamond fields). It is estimated that between 1990 and 2005, Zimbabwe lost 21 percent (one-fifth) of its forest cover (i.e. 4.7 million hectares), and currently 313,000 hectares of forest disappear every year. In 2013, 15% of the deforestation concerned land-clearing for tobacco-farming, and getting firewood for tobacco-curing. According to a Zimbabwe Conservation Task Force report in June 2007, more than half of all Zimbabwe's wildlife had died since 2000, due to poaching and deforestation. Land degradation is expected to cause major soil erosion, plus flooding and groundwater-pollution problems, significantly reducing the habitable farmland area.

Rich people are increasingly on the move too, trying to escape from high taxes, unsafe conditions, environmental hazards and socio-political instability. According to the Global Wealth Migration Review 2018, some 95,000 millionaires (HNWIs) migrated in 2017, top destinations being North America, Australasia, United Arab Emirates, Israel, Switzerland and Singapore. The exit of wealthy people affected mainly China, India, Turkey, United Kingdom, France, Russia, Brazil, Indonesia, Saudi Arabia, Nigeria and Venezuela.

Organizational instability

The management of both business and government organizations has become permanently unstable, and restructuring is nowadays a never-ending process, so that staff is constantly being replaced or shifted around, while work systems are being redesigned all the time – giving rise to complaints that nothing works anymore like it should and that there is no job security anymore. If job security is gone, workers have less freedom, because they have less control over what will or might happen to their lives in the future; it becomes more difficult for them to make good life-choices and plans, if they don't even have reasonably good information about what is likely to happen, financially or otherwise. If things are in flux, or in a chaos, it gets hard to know what can be concluded from the experience of what happens and judge things well. Sufficient order and predictability are needed, to be able to learn and adapt constructively to new situations.

According to the Dutch central bank, half the fall of the Dutch wage-share in the country's net value-added across 1996-2015 was attributable to "labour market flexibilization".

Throwing more money at the problems however may not solve very much organizationally, although employees are grateful for extra cash. Repeatedly the money just disappears down a hole. When some of America's most powerful and well-resourced corporations were paid billions of dollars to rebuild Iraq, it turned out that they couldn't even organize basic things properly, like getting the power, water and gas connected again.

There is much uncertainty and unease about what the future might bring, because nobody really knows for sure what will happen, except that new crises are likely. The Global Risks Report 2018 of the elite World Economic Forum group envisages the scenario of "the death of trade", or "the end of trade as we know it". This would involve escalating trade wars, currency wars, and geopolitical turmoil that spread quickly around the globe, with weak regulatory bodies powerless to resolve anything. International laws, agreements and conventions would no longer be heeded; commercial trade would be governed by the law of the jungle and military power.

Similarly, in April 2018, IMF managing director Christine Lagarde referred to anxieties about global trade and tariff wars, a few years into the future. She said that national protectionist policies could tear apart the institutional and legal frameworks governing global trade.

The informal circuit

Globally, the shadow economy, the informal sector, the scope of criminal activity, corruption and the unemployed "surplus population" all remain very large.  A lot of petty crime is no longer reported or recorded, since the police does not have the resources to cope with it, and victims do not bother to report it anymore. Kiki Seokhee Yoon states that "To the best of our knowledge, the probability that a crime will be reported is about 50 percent or less." Buonanno et al. (2017) say that "measuring crime is a challenging issue for social scientists".

According to CNN Money, "Top executives at the so-called "too big to fail" banks have avoided any criminal charges, even as their banks paid tens of billions of dollars in fines to settle charges of wrongdoing leading up to the financial crisis."

Friedrich Schneider however claims the shadow economy is decreasing in the long run.

The Corruption Perceptions Index is only an indicator of corruption in the public sector of the economy, and not of corruption in the private sector, even although the private sector is much larger than the public sector. This index cannot show whether the total amount of corruption globally is increasing, constant, or decreasing. A more comprehensive measure is the Global Corruption Barometer.

"In a criminalized capitalism, where the state and the private sector increasingly work together to rob and exploit the people, crime does pay. Yet the decay of bourgeois values does not automatically prompt a struggle for better values. It could also lead to a long-term degeneration of all human values, the destruction of humanism, and the disappearance of belief in the sanctity of human life and in the defense of human dignity."

Alternatives

More and more alternatives are developing to the capitalist mode of production, for the purpose of making a life, for allocating resources, for work and for organizing production (see also Sharing economy). If people share instead of competing, they can often reduce their costs. This insight is especially important to people when they have become impoverished.

Prospects
The overall economic importance of these ten trends for capitalist value relations is disputed, among other things because they have always existed to some or other extent. It isn't clear, in what sense quantitative changes also imply qualitative changes in the functioning of capitalist society, or to what extent qualitative changes are quantitatively significant.
 Critics of capitalism argue that there are problems for capitalism today that cannot be solved at all, within the framework of capitalist value relations.
 Supporters of capitalism argue that ways will be found to get round the problems, and that capitalism is flexible or resilient enough to overcome all crises.
 The supporters of Henryk Grossman are firmly focused on the collapse of capitalism, when total surplus value shrinks and class struggle intensifies.
 Another position says that the problems can be solved within capitalism in some piecemeal or ad hoc way, but that this occurs at the expense of a gradual degeneration of capitalism.
 Some argue that capitalism is evolving or mutating into a post-capitalism, managerial capitalism, hypercapitalism, cybercapitalism or semiocapitalism - with different kinds of property rights and work organization.
 The term late capitalism has made a comeback in the United States, as an ironic expression referring to absurd, hypocritical, unjust and fake aspects of contemporary business civilization. Paul Krugman stated in 2018 that "I’ve had several interviews lately in which I was asked whether capitalism had reached a dead end, and needed to be replaced with something else. I'm never sure what the interviewers have in mind; neither, I suspect, do they."
 There are also intellectuals on the Left and the Right who argue that, if present trends continue, we are headed for a mediocre, dumbed down capitalism, where expectations are low, economic growth is lacklustre and nothing works properly anymore.

So there is no agreement about the future of capitalism, the prognoses are difficult to prove, and all kinds of things could contingently happen. All the different perspectives may have part of the truth. Hillel Ticktin, the editor of the socialist journal Critique, describes the global situation as "an intermediate period in a transitional world." Mark Blaug argued that "the central weakness of modern economics" is "the reluctance to produce the theories that yield unambiguously refutable implications, followed by a general unwillingness to confront those implications with the facts." These days accurate and comprehensive forecasts are worth gigantic amounts of money, and so, such forecasts often become a well-guarded secret. A lot of research is no longer being done, because if it is done, it is immediately stolen without trace (by hackers and burglars who want to cream off and head off the most advanced ideas at their point of production, in real time). In 2018, The Economist Intelligence Unit ranked a severe cyber attack crippling corporate and government activities among the top 10 risks to the global economy. At the micro-level, Dutch researchers studied a sample of 1,058 youths aged 12 to 18 years in 2018, and found that 5.1% of youths said they had sometimes hacked without permission into email accounts, 15,2% into mobile phones, and 5,4% into networks. Around 12% said they hadn't done it, but could do it. 54.6% said they would "never hack", but 45.4% said they might give it a try.

In the wake of each big capitalist crisis, both Marxists and non-Marxists have prophesied the end of capitalism.
Critics of breakdown theories, by contrast, argue that systemic crises, though hardly pleasant, are precisely the way through which the developmental problems and growing pains of capitalist business are resolved. Each crisis can also be approached not as a cause of misery, but as an opportunity to do things differently, or to realize the things that powerful people wanted to get done for a long time already. Things "get to the crunch" and when they do, business leaders and politicians have to do something about them. Through terrible ordeals, new techniques for managing, controlling and exploiting people are developed, which later go mainstream. And, after a fierce competition (or a war) involving capitalists, workers, states and nations, a new era of economic growth usually opens up. In the new era, typically a completely new group of capitalists takes the driving seat.

So although it might "seem like" the end of capitalism is nigh, it could also be merely a transition to a new kind of capitalism – a new capitalist regime, which evolved out of what was there before, but which few people had thought of, before it emerged. As an allocation principle, the forms of value could possibly be much more persistent and long-lasting than Marxists and socialists think, even if they mutate into new configurations.

It is also possible that a new scientific understanding of socialism and communism will still emerge in the future, that sheds new light on the role of value in human society. So far, this understanding is actively blocked and suppressed by Western Marxist academics, among other things because they believe that socialism never existed and/or cannot exist, and that value, markets and money are basically the same things. Some argue, that socialism should not exist, only full communism should exist - with many nice clothes, houses, Ferraris, yachts, etc. Ernest Mandel states that, for the top communist functionaries in the Stalinist era, there was a sense in which communism already existed. Firstly, whenever these communist leaders withdrew funds from their Gosbank account to buy things, their debit was automatically cancelled out with a new credit to the same amount. Secondly, they could go to special shops not accessible to the general public, where they could buy almost anything they wanted. The elite banking practice was stopped by Nikita Khrushchev's government.

Thermodynamics
John Bellamy Foster and Paul Burkett (2018) state that "...we are seeing today numerous attempts to conceptualize commodity value as the product not just of human labor, but of animal labor in general and, beyond that, of energy in general". Since 2016, the post-Keynesian economist Steve Keen has argued that any credible theory of value, whether classical, neo-classical or heterodox, must be consistent with the physical laws of thermodynamics. He claims that "every school of thought from the Neoclassicals to the Marxists" had been wrong on this issue, and all previous theories of economic value are flawed for that reason.

This is not a new idea (it was raised by Elmar Altvater in 1991, Nicholas Georgescu-Roegen in 1971, and Frederick Soddy in 1921) but Keen proposes a new type of production function, in which energy plays an essential role. The economist Anwar Shaikh however rejects the neo-classical concept of the production function as kind of sudoku game, preferring a reconstructed classical economics solidly based on empirical facts and econometric evidence.

See also
Critique of political economy
Monetary theory of value
Neue Marx-Lektüre
Silent barter
Socialist market economy
Types of socialism
Use value

References

Marxian critique of political economy
Marxian economics